Magnolia Bakery is a chain of bakeries founded in New York City. The first location opened in 1996 at 401 Bleecker Street, on the corner of West 11th Street in the West Village neighborhood of Manhattan. The bakery is known for its desserts, especially its cupcakes and banana pudding.

History 
The original Magnolia Bakery was opened in 1996 by Jennifer Appel and Allysa Torey. The bakery began making cupcakes with leftover cake batter, and the cupcakes subsequently became very popular with customers. The bakery is sometimes credited with helping to start a 1990s "cupcake craze". Co-owners Jennifer Appel and Allysa Torey published a book in 1999 entitled The Magnolia Bakery Cookbook: Old-Fashioned Recipes from New York's Sweetest Bakery.

In 1999, co-owner Jennifer Appel left the business after a disagreement about expansion plans. Appel opened Buttercup Bake Shop at 973 Second Avenue in the Midtown East section of Manhattan. In 2006, Allysa Torey sold Magnolia Bakery to Steve Abrams. The company was sold to a private equity firm co-founded by Hudson Yards developer Stephen Ross in early 2021 and appointed Bobbie Lloyd as Chief Executive Officer.

In popular culture 
The exterior of the original bakery, as well as its cupcakes, were featured in "Lazy Sunday", a Saturday Night Live Digital Short broadcast in December 2005. The bakery was also featured on Sex and the City; in the film Prime, in which one of the characters throws Magnolia pies at his ex-girlfriends; and in The Devil Wears Prada, in which the character Andy says at one point that she needs to get to the bakery to pick something up for her boyfriend. The sitcom Spin City also has Charlie Sheen's character bringing Magnolia Cupcakes to Heather Locklear's character.  On October 16, 2008, Conan O'Brien bought a cupcake for each member of his audience during a taping of Late Night. It was also briefly mentioned in the third season of Veronica Mars, the title character affectionately mentioning a picture of her father "stuffing cupcakes in [his] face at Magnolia Bakery."

Locations 

Magnolia Bakery has expanded from its original location with additional stores in the U.S. and internationally. In 2011, Magnolia Bakery CEO Steve Abrams stated that he had plans to open approximately three stores a year, adding that he would work with franchisees to expand overseas.

The company's U.S. locations include stores in New York City, Boston, Chicago, Los Angeles, and Washington, DC.  A franchise in Honolulu that featured Magnolia's first sit-down, full-service restaurant in the U.S. closed on October 27, 2018.

Magnolia Bakery's first non-U.S. store opened in Dubai in 2010, with two additional franchises opening in Dubai and one in Abu Dhabi.  Other international franchises are currently operating in Saudi Arabia, which has eight locations as of October 2020; Qatar, which has four locations; Amman, Jordan; Daegu, South Korea; Taguig, Philippines (where it is known as M Bakery); and Mexico City, Mexico. A store also opened in Moscow, but then closed on July 1, 2016.

In May 2018, CEO Steve Abrams announced the launch of up to 200 new Magnolia stores across the United States. The company also plans to open branches in Manila and Sao Paulo.

Magnolia launched its first outlet in India in November 2019 in the city of Bangalore.

References

External links 

 

Bakeries of the United States
Culture of Manhattan
Greenwich Village
Restaurants in Manhattan
Restaurants established in 1996
West Village
Upper West Side
Midtown Manhattan
1996 establishments in New York City